Living Biblically is an American television sitcom created by Patrick Walsh and executive produced by Walsh and Johnny Galecki, with co-executive producers Andrew Haas, Spencer Medof, and director Andy Ackerman. The series was based on A. J. Jacobs' best-selling book, The Year of Living Biblically. The Warner Bros. Television-produced series began airing on CBS on February 26, 2018. The running time was thirty minutes per episode and included a laugh track. On May 11, 2018, CBS canceled the series after only eight of the thirteen first season episodes had aired. The network aired the remaining episodes from July 7 until July 21, 2018.

Plot
The series chronicles a married film critic and expectant father's decision to improve his life by living according to the Bible, literally, after the death of his best friend.

Cast

Main
Jay R. Ferguson as Chip Curry, a film critic for a newspaper who decides to improve his life by following the Bible literally after the death of his best friend.
Lindsey Kraft as Leslie Curry, Chip's overbearing, pregnant wife who does not believe in Chip's new interest in Christianity.
Ian Gomez as Father Gene, a liberal priest who is amused that with Chip's plan to follow the Bible by the book but remains supportive. His full name is revealed to be Eugenio Alberto Del Castillo Cabeza de Vaca.
David Krumholtz as Rabbi Gil Ableman, a rabbi at the local synagogue who is supportive of Chip.
Tony Rock as Vince, Chip's skeptical but supportive friend and co-worker. 
Camryn Manheim as Ms. Meadows, Chip, Vince and Cheryl's strict and selfish boss, who cares only about money and the newspaper's success. Her first name is never mentioned.
Sara Gilbert as Cheryl, a sarcastic co-worker of Chip's who writes obituaries.

Episodes

Ratings

Production 
On May 12, 2017, the show was ordered to series under the title By the Book. On November 21, 2017, it was announced that the series, now titled Living Biblically, would premiere in the spring of 2018 and air on Mondays at 9:30 P.M. The series premiered February 26, 2018, on CBS and was given a thirteen episode order. On April 19, 2018, CBS pulled the series from the schedule after eight low-rated episodes, leaving five episodes unaired, and announced that the series will remain in production for all thirteen episodes and would return to the schedule at a later date. On May 11, 2018, it was decided not to renew for another season.  On June 7, 2018 it was announced that the show would return to the schedule on July 7, 2018 and the remaining five episodes would air over a three-week period. The final episode aired on July 21, 2018.

Reception
On Rotten Tomatoes, the series holds an approval rating of 18% based on 17 reviews, with an average rating of 4.26/10. The site's critical consensus reads, "Living Biblically commits the cardinal TV sin of wasting the outline of a refreshingly unusual premise on broad, hammy acting and stock sitcom laughs." On Metacritic, the series has a weighted average score of 47 out of 100, based on 8 critics, indicating "mixed or average reviews".

References

2010s American sitcoms
2018 American television series debuts
2018 American television series endings
American fantasy television series

Television series based on the Bible
CBS original programming
Religious comedy television series
Television shows based on books
Television series about journalism
Television shows set in New York City
English-language television shows
Television series by Warner Bros. Television Studios
Angels in television